Orla Therese Muldoon is an Irish social and political psychologist and founding professor of psychology at the University of Limerick. Her research concerns how groups memberships and social identities affect health and well-being.

Education and career

Muldoon attended Queen's University of Belfast where she received her bachelor's degree. She earned her Ph.D. from Queen's University of Belfast in 1996. During this time she also attended University of Michigan as a John F Kennedy Travel Scholar. She was a faculty member at Ulster University and Queens University Belfast. She moved to University of Limerick in 2007 to lead the development of a new department of psychology.

Muldoon is editor-in-chief of the journal Political Psychology, a position she shares with James Liu. She was formerly editor-in-chief of the Journal of Community and Applied Social Psychology.

Research 
Muldoon's research concerns how groups memberships and social identities affect health and well-being. She has examined gender and nursing students, the impact of the war in North Ireland on children, how children view food and eating. and social identity and post-traumatic stress disorder. Muldoon has raised concern's about Ireland's response to the COVID-19 pandemic because of the lack of diversity on the panel making recommendations. She has spoken with the media about the statistics of violence against women, and is a regular opinion contributor to The Irish Times.

Selected publications

Awards and honors 
In 2020, Muldoon won the Nevitt Sanford Award for outstanding contributions to political psychology from the International Society of Political Psychology. She received a Fulbright Award in 2020, and was one of the first two women in Ireland to receive a European Research Council Advanced Grant. In 2022 she was elected a member of the Royal Irish Academy.

References

External links 
 

Living people
Academics of Queen's University Belfast
Academics of the University of Limerick
Academics of Ulster University
Alumni of Queen's University Belfast
Irish women psychologists
Members of the Royal Irish Academy
Political psychologists
Psychology journal editors
Social psychologists
Year of birth missing (living people)